Sandro Rodríguez Felipe (born 26 May 1990) is a Spanish professional footballer who last played for Indian I-League side Chennai City as a midfielder.

Club career
Born in Tenerife, Rodríguez represented UD Geneto and CD Sobradillo as a youth before joining the academy of CD Tenerife. In September 2009, he made his debut for the reserves, in an away match against CD Puertollano in Tercera División. On 15 April 2012, he made his debut for the senior team in a 1–1 draw against CD Lugo in Segunda División B.

On 3 August 2012, Rodríguez was loaned out to fellow league club CD Marino for the upcoming season. On 20 January 2014, he signed for UD Las Palmas B.

After spending three seasons with UD Ibarra in Tercera, Rodríguez moved abroad for the first time in his career and joined Indian club Chennai City on 2 May 2018. On 26 October, he made his debut in a 4–1 triumph over Indian Arrows. On 1 November, he scored his first goal for the club in a 2–2 draw against Churchill Brothers.

Honours

Club
Chennai City FC
I-League: 2018–19

References

External links

1990 births
Living people
Association football midfielders
Spanish footballers
Segunda División B players
Tercera División players
CD Tenerife B players
CD Tenerife players
CD Marino players
UD Las Palmas Atlético players
UD Las Palmas C players
I-League players
Chennai City FC players
Spanish expatriate footballers
Expatriate footballers in India
Spanish expatriate sportspeople in India